Ned Coughlan (born 1943) is an Irish retired Gaelic footballer who played as a centre-forward for the Cork senior football team.

Born in Mitchelstown, County Cork, Coughlan first played competitive football in his youth. He arrived on the inter-county scene at the age of seventeen when he first linked up with the Cork minor team, before later joining the under-21 and junior sides. He made his senior debut during the 1962 championship and was a regular member of the starting fifteen for a brief period. He was a Munster runner-up on three occasions.

At club level Coughlan won numerous championship medals with Mitchelstown.

Throughout his career Coughlan played just five championship games for Cork. His retirement came following the conclusion of the 1965 championship.

Honours

Team

Mitchelstown
Cork Intermediate Football Championship (1): 1965
Cork Junior Football Championship (1): 1961
Cork Minor Football Championship (1): 1960

Avondhu
Cork Senior Football Championship (1): 1961

Cork
Munster Junior Football Championship (1): 1962
Munster Under-21 Football Championship (1): 1963
All-Ireland Minor Football Championship (1): 1961
Munster Minor Football Championship (2): 1960, 1961

References

1943 births
Living people
Mitchelstown Gaelic footballers
Cork inter-county Gaelic footballers